James Davis VC (February 1835 – 2 March 1893) was a Scottish recipient of the Victoria Cross, the highest and most prestigious award for gallantry in the face of the enemy that can be awarded to British and Commonwealth forces.

His full name was James Davis Kelly, but he dropped Kelly when he enlisted

Details
Davis was approximately 23 years old, and a private in the 42nd Regiment of Foot, later The Black Watch (Royal Highlanders), British Army during the Indian Mutiny when the following deed took place on 15 April 1858 during the attack on Fort Ruhya, India for which he was awarded the VC.

His VC is on display in the Lord Ashcroft Gallery at the Imperial War Museum, London.

References

 Harvey, David, Monuments to Courage, 1999
 The Register of the Victoria Cross (This England, 1997)
 Ross, Graham, Scotland's Forgotten Valour, 1995

External links
Location of grave and VC medal (Edinburgh)
 

British recipients of the Victoria Cross
Indian Rebellion of 1857 recipients of the Victoria Cross
Black Watch soldiers
Military personnel from Edinburgh
1835 births
1893 deaths
British Army personnel of the Crimean War
British Army recipients of the Victoria Cross